The Ladies Musical Club (LMC) of Seattle, Washington was founded in 1891, making it Seattle's oldest musical organization. Although it began as a women's organization, it now also accepts men as full members. The LMC is a 501c(3) nonprofit.

History 
The club was founded less than two years after the Great Seattle Fire of 1889. Twenty-two women musicians, mostly "married middle-class women, who had received musical training," gathered on March 2, 1891, at the home of Ellen Bartlett Bacon to form an organization dedicated to classical music. Despite an audition being required to join the club, the membership more than doubled within the year.

At a time when it was difficult for women to become professional musicians, LMC provided an opportunity for public performance. In the early years, active members were all required to perform regularly at club events; associate members did not participate as performers, and this latter category of membership was opened to men by the 1893/1894 season.

LMC concerts were not confined to struggling women performers. Beginning with the 1900/1901 season, LMC sponsored public concerts by male and female professional artists. From the outset, Rose Gottstein led this aspect of the club's activities, and she continued in this role until 1939, when she died. Between 1900 and 1995, they hosted performances by, among many others, Teresa Carreño, Geraldine Farrar, Sergei Rachmaninoff, Fritz Kreisler, Jascha Heifetz, Marian Anderson, Igor Stravinsky, Yehudi Menuhin, Pablo Casals, Kirsten Flagstad, Arthur Rubinstein, Vladimir Horowitz, Joshua Bell, Emmanuel Ax, Elly Ameling, Marilyn Horne, and Nadja Salerno-Sonnenberg. However, eventually, the cost of putting on concerts by major stars exceeded the club's capacity, and they partnered with the University of Washington to host classical music concerts at the university's Meany Hall.

When the LMC began, Seattle had neither a symphony orchestra, an opera company, nor a notable school of music. The LMC brought, on a regular basis, concerts unlike what the city had seen previously. These included the Chicago Symphony Orchestra (1901/1902 season), Walter Damrosch and the New York Symphony Orchestra (1907/1908 season), and an entire Italian opera company (1920/1921 season). The LMC also provided financial help to both the Seattle Symphony (founded 1903) and the Cornish School (founded 1914, now Cornish College of the Arts) in their early years. Cornish School founder Nellie Cornish was a member.

Present day 
The LMC sponsors roughly sixty solo and chamber music concerts per year in a variety of venues in the Seattle area, with a season running from October to May. These concerts are free to the public.

In addition, they sponsor the Frances Walton Competition for classical musicians ages 20–35, both solo and small ensembles. The competition is open to players of string instruments, piano, woodwinds, brass, voice, marimba, and recorders, and offers cash prizes and performance opportunities, including Classical KING-FM ("Classical KING FM").

They also sponsor classical concerts in under-served Washington State public schools. In recent years, these have sometimes gone beyond classical music, especially in their schools' programs where, for example, in 2016-2017 they sponsored a set of performances by step-dancing group Step Afrika! as well as a more obvious choice, Calidore String Quartet. Other 21st-century programs in the schools have included Miro Quartet, The Nile Project, SO Percussion, Martha Redbone, and the Daedalus String Quartet .

References

External links
 
 Includes an extensive digital archive
 CityStream: Ladies Musical Club on the Seattle Channel, 2014-03-06, includes excerpts from a string quartet and from an in-school performance called Rhythms of India.

Further reading 
 “The History of the Ladies Musical Club is Like the Biography of a Great Man”: Women, Place, Repertory, Race, and the Ladies Musical Club of Seattle, 1891-1950, Whitney Henderson, 2018 (University of Washington dissertation).

Music organizations based in the United States
Non-profit organizations based in Seattle
501(c)(3) organizations
Classical music in the United States
Music of Seattle